Wysocki (feminine: Wysocka, plural: Wysoccy) is a surname of Polish origin. Notable people with the surname include:

 Adam Wysocki (born 1974), Polish sprint canoeist
 Alfred Wysocki (1873-1959), Polish lawyer and diplomat 
 Antoni Wysocki (1884–1940), member of the Greater Poland Uprising
 Ben Wysocki (born 1984), American drummer
 Bert "Sock" Wysocki, Reaper TV series character
 Charles Wysocki (artist) (1928–2002), American painter
 Charles Wysocki (biologist), American biologist and psychologist
 Erin Wysocki-Jones (born 1992), British Paralympic coxswain 
 Jacob Wysocki (born 1990), American actor and comedian
 Jarek Wysocki, The Chicago Code character 
 John Wysocki (1916–1965), American football player
 Jonathan Wysocki (born 1976), American writer, director and producer 
 Jon Wysocki (born 1971), American drummer for the rock band Staind
 Józef Wysocki (1809–1873), Polish general
 Konrad Wysocki (born 1982), Polish-German basketball player
 Krystyna Krupska-Wysocka (1935–2020), Polish film director
 Lidia Wysocka (1916–2006), Polish actress
 Lucian Wysocki (1899–1964), German Nazi Party politician, Police President
 Małgorzata Wysocka (born 1979), Polish road cyclist
 Mariusz Wysocki (born 1976), Polish soccer player
 Marzena Wysocka (born 1969), Polish discus thrower
 Mary Anne Wysocki, victim of Tony Costa
 Mikolaj Wysocki (1595–1650) was a Polish Evangelical theologian
 Pete Wysocki (1948–2003), American football player
 Piotr Wysocki (1797–1875), Polish lieutenant
 Przemysław Wysocki (born 1989), Polish soccer player
 Rebecca Wisocky (born 1979), American actress
 Ricky Wysocki (born 1993), American professional disc golfer
 Ruth Wysocki (born 1957), American runner
 Sheila Wysocki
 Stanisława Wysocka (1877–1941), Polish actress and theatre director
 Wiesław Wysocki (born 1950), Polish historian
 Władysław Wysocki (1908–1943), Polish soldier
 Vicki Wysocki, American chemist
 Vonda Wysocki, The Chicago Code character 
 Zdzisław Wysocki (born 1944), Polish composer

Other
 Wysocki coat of arms
 Wysocki, Masovian Voivodeship, Poland
 Wysocki Młyn, Kuyavian-Pomeranian Voivodeship, Poland

See also
 
 
Vysotsky (disambiguation)

Polish-language surnames